Aidan Luke Chippendale (born 24 May 1992) is an English footballer who plays as a winger for Bury AFC.

Career

Bradford City and Huddersfield Town
Born in Bradford, West Yorkshire, Chippendale played for hometown club Bradford City in their youth system before being released at the age of 13 when he joined Huddersfield Town. He was promoted to the first team squad for a game against Colchester United on 3 October 2009. He was named Huddersfield's Academy Player of the Year for the 2009–10 season and graduated from the club's academy in April 2010 after being offered a two-year professional contract. He made his debut for Huddersfield as a substitute in a 1–0 win over Bristol Rovers at the Memorial Stadium on 12 March 2011.

York City (loan)
On 25 March 2011, he joined Conference Premier club York City on loan until 30 April. After not being involved in any matches during his first month at the club, Huddersfield manager Lee Clark recalled Chippendale from his loan on 19 April 2011.

Inverness Caledonian Thistle (loan)
On 31 August 2011, Chippendale joined Scottish Premier League side Inverness Caledonian Thistle on loan until January 2012. He made his debut for Inverness on 10 September 2011 as an 81st-minute substitute against Hearts at the Caledonian Stadium in a 1–1 draw. He returned to Huddersfield on 9 January after his loan expired.

He left Huddersfield club in June 2012, after not being offered a new contract by manager Simon Grayson.

Accrington Stanley
Chippendale signed a one-year contract with League Two side Accrington Stanley after a successful trial on 25 July 2012. He made his debut for Accrington in a League Cup fixture on 11 August 2012 against Carlisle United in a 1–0 loss at Brunton Park. Chippendale was released by Accrington Stanley in May 2013 after struggling to make an impact and only starting four games for the club.

Bury F.C. 
On 23 July 2013, Chippendale signed a one-year contract with League Two side Bury F.C. after a successful trial. On 5 November 2013, Bury F.C. confirmed that Chippendale's contract had been cancelled by mutual consent.

Chester (loan)
On 23 August 2013, Chippendale signed on loan for a month at Chester.

Fylde and Ashton United
Following his departure from Bury, Chippendale signed for Fylde in December 2013 Then joining Ashton United for the remaining of the 2013–14 season.

Stalybridge Celtic
In July 2014 he joined Stalybridge Celtic.

Bradford Park Avenue
In January 2017 he joined Bradford Park Avenue.

FC United of Manchester
In July 2017 he joined FC United of Manchester but left the club later that month without playing a competitive match.

Shaw Lane
He then joined Shaw Lane.

Stalybridge Celtic (second spell)
He rejoined Stalybridge on 1 September 2017.

Ossett Albion and Ossett United
He joined Ossett Albion before then moving to Ossett's new team Ossett United in the summer of 2018.

Colne FC & Bury AFC
Chippendale joined Colne F.C. in the summer 2019. In March 2020, he was loaned out to Ossett United until the end of the season.

On 26 September 2020, Chippendale joined Bury AFC for the rest of 2020. He returned to Bury in July 2021.

Career statistics

References

External links

1992 births
Living people
Footballers from Bradford
English footballers
Association football wingers
Bradford City A.F.C. players
Huddersfield Town A.F.C. players
York City F.C. players
Inverness Caledonian Thistle F.C. players
Accrington Stanley F.C. players
Bury F.C. players
Chester F.C. players
Stalybridge Celtic F.C. players
Ashton United F.C. players
AFC Fylde players
English Football League players
Scottish Premier League players
Bradford (Park Avenue) A.F.C. players
F.C. United of Manchester players
Shaw Lane A.F.C. players
Ossett Albion A.F.C. players
Ossett United F.C. players
Bury A.F.C. players